PZL M-2 was a Polish trainer aircraft prototype of 1958, a low-wing monoplane with fixed gear. Designed at WSK-Mielec, it did not enter production.

Design and development 
The M-2 was designed as a trainer aircraft for the Polish Aero Club by the newly created construction bureau of the WSK Mielec factory. The aircraft's main designer was Stanisław Jachyra. The first prototype was flown on 26 June 1958 (registration SP-PAC) with the second prototype flying on 13 September that year (registration SP-PBA).

The aircraft was of relatively modern, all-metal construction. Its major drawback was its engine, an imported Praga Doris flat-six piston engine, which caused vibration and was not suitable for aerobatics. This limited the potential use of the aircraft. It was proposed to replace the engine with the Polish designed and built Narkiewicz WN-6 flat-six engine, but this was still under development and was never perfected. Due to the problems with the powerplant, the development of the aircraft was delayed, and in the meantime, the Polish Aero Club changed its preferences to aircraft with a tricycle landing gear and withdrew its interest in the M-2. As a result, the M-2 did not enter production and further work was abandoned. A development of the M-2 was the PZL M-4 Tarpan, with a retractable tricycle landing gear.

Description 
Metal construction low-wing monoplane, conventional in layout, metal covered. Semi-monocoque fuselage. Trapezoid  wings, two-spar, fitted with flaps. Crew of two, sitting in tandem, under a common canopy, with double controls (student in front, instructor in the rear). Fixed conventional landing gear. Flat engine in front, two-blade tractor propeller, 2.3 m diameter. Fuel tanks in wings - 120 L.

Survivors 
The first prototype (SP-PAC) is stored in the Polish Aviation Museum in Kraków (disassembled), the second prototype (SP-PBA) is preserved as a monument in Radomyśl Wielki near Mielec.

Specifications

See also

References

 Janusz Babiejczuk, Jerzy Grzegorzewski: Polski przemysł lotniczy 1945-1973, Warsaw 1973 
 Taylor, John W. R. Jane's All The World's Aircraft 1961–62. London: Sampson Low, Marston & Company, 1961.
 Jakub Marszałkiewicz - Samolot szkolno-treningowy PZL-M2
 PZL M-2 at Ugolok Neba

External links

 Photos and drawings

1950s Polish civil trainer aircraft
M02
Low-wing aircraft
Single-engined tractor aircraft
Aircraft first flown in 1958